Shahid Hasan (born 4 January 1966), known by professionally as Misha Sawdagor, is a Bangladeshi film actor known for playing villains. As of 2020, he has performed in more than 700 films. He won Bangladesh National Film Awards 3 times for his roles in the films Boss Number One (2011), Olpo Olpo Premer Golpo (2014) and Bir (2020).

Background and career
Shahid Hasan was born on 4 January 1966 in Old Dhaka, the fourth of five children of Bilkis Rashida and Osman Gani. 

Sawdagor was discovered through a talent hunt programme organized by the Bangladesh Film Development Corporation in 1986 to find new faces. He selected the stage name "Misha Sawdagor", constructed from the first letters of his wife's name, Mita, and those of his name, combined with his grandfather's last name, Sawdagor.

Sawdagor landed the role of the hero in the 1990 film Chetona, directed by Chhatku Ahmed. Sawdagor and Mita married on 6 December 1993.

His career took off after he played the villain in Tamij Uddin Rizvi's 1995 film Asha Bhalobasha.

Filmography

Awards and nominations

x

References

External links
 

Living people
1966 births
People from Dhaka
Bangladeshi male film actors
Best Performance in a Comic Role National Film Award (Bangladesh) winners
Best Performance in a Negative Role National Film Award (Bangladesh) winners